Aryeh Ben-Eliezer (16 December 1913 – 29 January 1970) was a Revisionist Zionist leader, Irgun member and Israeli politician.

Biography
Aryeh Ben-Eliezer (born Lipa Zabrowsky) was born  in Vilnius in the Russian Empire (today in Lithuania). His family immigrated to Mandatory Palestine in 1920. He attended high schools in Tel Aviv.

Zionist activism
At the age of thirteen, he joined Betar and during the 1929 Palestine riots and the 1936 riots took an active part in the battle for Tel Aviv. Between 1932 and 1939 he served as an emissary for Betar and the Irgun in Poland, Romania and the Baltic countries.  In 1933, he was arrested for five weeks under suspicion of being connected to Brit HaBirionim.

After the outbreak of World War II, he was sent on an Irgun mission to the United States and helped to found the Committee for the Creation of a Hebrew Army. Together with Hillel Kook, Ari Jabotinsky, Shmuel Merlin and Yitzhak Ben-Ami, he founded the "Committee for the Rescue of European Jewry" and later on the "Committee for National Liberation".

In 1943, he returned to Palestine on a mission for the Committee for the Rescue of European Jewry. He met with Menachem Begin, who asked him to become a member of the first Irgun General Headquarters. In April 1944 he was once again arrested by the British, and was one of 251 detainees exiled in October of that year to Asmara, Eritrea, where he was the representative of the exiles before the British authorities. In January 1947 he succeeded in escaping with several comrades and made his way to France, where he helped to organize the voyage of  the Altalena.

Political career
In 1948, he returned to the newly declared State of Israel and was among the founders and leaders of the Herut movement. He also helped establish Israel's relations with France. He was elected for Herut to the first through fifth Knessets, and for Gahal to the sixth and seventh. He was a member of the Finance, Economic Affairs, Foreign Affairs & Defense and Internal Affairs Committees, as well as Deputy Speaker of the Knesset. He was one of the first to propose a referendum as a proviso for crucial decisions, as part of his party's opposition to the Reparations Agreement between Israel and West Germany.

He died in 1970 while still an MK, and was replaced by Gideon Patt.

Commemoration
The Israeli settlement of Beit Aryeh was named after him.  A main street in Ramat Gan,  is also named for him.

References

Further reading

External links

1913 births
1970 deaths
Deputy Speakers of the Knesset
Lithuanian Jews
Lithuanian emigrants to Mandatory Palestine
Israeli people of Lithuanian-Jewish descent
Betar members
Irgun members
Herut politicians
Gahal politicians
Members of the 1st Knesset (1949–1951)
Members of the 2nd Knesset (1951–1955)
Members of the 3rd Knesset (1955–1959)
Members of the 4th Knesset (1959–1961)
Members of the 5th Knesset (1961–1965)
Members of the 6th Knesset (1965–1969)
Members of the 7th Knesset (1969–1974)
Burials at Nahalat Yitzhak Cemetery